The Jewish cemetery of Besançon is located in the French city of Besançon. It is the only Jewish cemetery in the département of Doubs.

History 
The Jewish cemetery of Besançon is located on Anne Frank street, between the Bregille and Palente areas, in the northwest part of the city. The older part of the cemetery was procured by two notaries of the Jewish community of Besançon, in 1796. In 1839 the cemetery was expanded. The earliest graves date from 1849, and the cemetery is still in use. At the entrance of the cemetery a memorial commemorates the members of the Jewish community of Besançon killed during the First World War. Today the cemetery holds between 400 and 600 graves, in an area measuring about 935 m2.

Gallery

See also 
 Synagogue of Besançon
 History of the Jews in Besançon

References

External links 
 History of the Jewish community of Besançon (Migrations.Besancon.fr)   

Besancon
Buildings and structures in Besançon
Religion in Besançon
Tourist attractions in Besançon
1796 establishments in France